Brian Sørensen (born 15 July 1980) is a Danish football coach who is the manager of English club Everton F.C. (women).

Coaching career
Sørensen moved to Fortuna Hjørring in July 2012, after being coach in IK Skovbakken. He was an important part of Fortuna's success in the Danish women's football and UEFA Women's Champions League, winning the Danish Championship in 2014 and 2016 and reaching the quarter-finals in the 2016–17 UEFA Women's Champions League. 
In February 2018, he quit the club after six years to live in United States with his wife and footballer Camilla Kur Larsen. The team were in first place at the time and went on to finish 2017–18 Elitedivisionen winners.

Sørensen joined FC Nordsjælland in December 2018 as part of the staff and was elected as new head coach in July 2019.  The team were promoted to the Elitedivisionen for the 2019–20 season, where they finished in 3rd place and won the Danish Cup.

At the conclusion of his contract, Sørensen agreed a return to Fortuna Hjørring ahead of the 2021–22 season. He led the team to second place league finish and qualification for the 2022–23 UEFA Women's Champions League. 

On 8 April 2022, Women's Super League team Everton announced the appointment of Sørensen on an initial two-year contract ahead of the 2022–23 WSL season. He replaced caretaker manager Chris Roberts who had been serving in that role since the dismissal of Jean-Luc Vasseur.

Honours

Manager

IK Skovbakken
Danish Women's Cup: 2009

Fortuna Hjørring
Elitedivisionen: 2014, 2016
Danish Women's Cup: 2016; runners-up: 2013, 2015

FC Nordsjælland
Danish Women's Cup: 2020

References

External links

Brian Sørensen coach profile at fcn.dk

Living people
Danish football managers
Elitedivisionen managers
1980 births
People from Mariagerfjord Municipality
Sportspeople from the North Jutland Region